Charlotte Coliseum was a multi-purpose sports and entertainment arena located in Charlotte, North Carolina.  It was operated by the Charlotte Coliseum Authority, which also oversees the operation of Bojangles Coliseum (which was called Charlotte Coliseum prior to 1988), the Charlotte Convention Center, and Ovens Auditorium.  It is best known as the home of the NBA's Charlotte Hornets from 1988 to 2002, and the Charlotte Bobcats (now the second incarnation of the Hornets) from 2004 to 2005.

The Coliseum hosted 371 consecutive NBA sell-outs from December 1988 to November 1997, which includes seven playoff games.  It hosted its final NBA basketball game on October 26, 2005, a preseason game between the Charlotte Bobcats and the Indiana Pacers.

The city of Charlotte sold the property and the building, along with a Maya Lin commission outside it, was demolished via implosion on June 3, 2007.

History
This was the second building to use the name "Charlotte Coliseum"; Bojangles Coliseum, located on Independence Boulevard, originally opened as the Coliseum. The older Coliseum is still in use.

Construction on the Charlotte Coliseum began in 1986 and was opened on August 11, 1988, with a dedication by the Reverend Billy Graham. The architects, Odell Associates, claimed to have built a state-of-the-art venue, complete with an large eight-sided video scoreboard, but the arena contained far fewer luxury suites than other arenas built in that era. George Shinn had used the under-construction arena as his hole card to get the NBA to place a team in the city. With almost 24,000 seats, it was not only the largest venue in the league, but the largest basketball-specific arena ever to serve as a full-time home for an NBA team. Some thought the Coliseum was too big, but Shinn believed the area's longstanding support for college basketball made the Coliseum a more-than-viable home for an NBA team.

The day after the dedication, the United States Olympic basketball team was scheduled to play an exhibition game at the Coliseum. While preparing for the event, the 40,000-pound, $3.2 million scoreboard was being repositioned when it struck the ceiling and crashed to the floor, destroying both it and the court it landed on—an alternate floor was brought from Independence Arena in time for the game that night.

The Hornets would go on to lead the NBA in attendance in eight of its first nine seasons playing in "The Hive".  At one point, they sold out 371 consecutive games, or nearly nine consecutive seasons. However, poorly received decisions made by Shinn, as well as anger over personal scandals involving him, caused fan support to dwindle, and by then the Coliseum was seen by many as outdated and no longer suitable to be the home of a major professional sports team.  When the Hornets relocated to New Orleans, in 2002, the Hornets' attendance had dropped to last in the 29-team league.  

The Coliseum had fewer amenities than other NBA arenas built in its time. "As nice as the building was, it was ... the last
of the propeller airplanes before the jets came," said Max Muhleman of Charlotte-based Private Sports Consulting. While the Palace of Auburn Hills, which opened the same year, contained 180 luxury suites, the Coliseum had just eight.

In 2005 the Charlotte Coliseum was replaced with Charlotte Bobcats Arena, (now Spectrum Center) located in the First Ward of Uptown Charlotte. One of the Coliseum's last functions before being shuttered was ironically to serve as a shelter for people fleeing New Orleans in the wake of Hurricane Katrina in the fall of 2005.

Tenants
Although the Hornets were the best-known tenants of the Coliseum, many other teams called The Hive home.

The Charlotte Sting of the WNBA began play in the Coliseum upon their inception in 1997, but had moved to Spectrum Center in 2006.  During most Sting games, the upper level and a portion of the lower level were curtained off, reducing capacity to around 10,000.  However, during the Sting's unexpected run to the WNBA Finals in 2001, they attracted the largest crowd in WNBA history to one playoff game.

The Charlotte 49ers played in the Coliseum during their final days in the Sun Belt Conference from 1988 through 1993.  The Coliseum also played host to the 1989 Sun Belt men's basketball tournament, setting a record for attendance.  They moved back to their old home, Bojangles Coliseum (then known as Independence Arena) for the 1993–94 season, partly due to a desire for a more intimate atmosphere. The 49ers rarely came close to filling the arena, and they were frequently swallowed up in the environment.  Additionally, the Coliseum was located on the opposite side of the county from UNC Charlotte's campus, and was thus inconvenient to most of its student body.

Two now-defunct Arena Football League teams played in the Coliseum—the Charlotte Rage (1992–96) and the Carolina Cobras (2003–04).

When the NBA returned to Charlotte in 2004 with the expansion Bobcats, they played their first season (2004–05) in the Coliseum as what became the Spectrum Center was being built.

Although the Coliseum and all but one of its parking lots had been demolished as of September 2013, the street leading to the grounds named Hive Drive (after the Coliseum's nickname of "The Hive", which has since been applied to the second Hornets' home arena) and a sign at the beginning guiding drivers to the Coliseum and surrounding amenities remained for some time afterward. Additionally, for some years after the arena's demolition, signs on Billy Graham Parkway continued to direct drivers to the "Coliseum Area."

Notable events
The arena was also used for college basketball events.  The Coliseum hosted the 1994 Men's Final Four and the 1996 Women's Final Four (both jointly hosted by Davidson College and UNC Charlotte), in addition to NCAA tournament regionals, sub-regionals, eight ACC men's basketball tournaments and the 1989 Sun Belt Conference men's basketball tournament.

It also hosted the 1991 NBA All-Star Game. It was also the site of WWE Unforgiven 1999 and Judgment Day 2003.

In addition to the many sporting events hosted at the Coliseum, it hosted large concerts.  The first concert was not long after the grand opening and featured Frank Sinatra.  Another blue eyed-crooner, Rick "The Big Bopper" Sammons, was the final performer to entertain in the coliseum.

In film
The Coliseum was home to filming of the movie Eddie in 1996, and was the Tech Dome, home of the fictitious Tech University in the 1998 film He Got Game. It was also featured in 2002's Juwanna Mann.

Current use
City Park, a mixed-use development, was constructed on the former site. City Park includes town homes, apartments, hotels, and restaurants. A plaque honoring the former arena is placed near the front of the development.

Notes

External links
 Charlotte Coliseum implosion footage

1988 establishments in North Carolina
2005 disestablishments in North Carolina
Charlotte 49ers basketball venues
Charlotte Hornets venues
Charlotte Hornets
Charlotte Sting venues
Defunct indoor arenas in the United States
Former National Basketball Association venues
Demolished sports venues in North Carolina
Event venues established in 1988
Former music venues in the United States
Sports venues demolished in 2007
Defunct sports venues in North Carolina
Music venues in North Carolina
Sports venues completed in 1988
Indoor arenas in North Carolina
NCAA Division I men's basketball tournament Final Four venues
Buildings and structures demolished by controlled implosion